E3 ubiquitin-protein ligase RING2 is an enzyme that in humans is encoded by the RNF2 gene.

Polycomb group (PcG) of proteins form the multiprotein complexes that are important for the transcription repression of various genes involved in development and cell proliferation. The protein encoded by this gene is one of the PcG proteins. It has been shown to interact with, and suppress the activity of, transcription factor CP2 (TFCP2/CP2). Studies of the mouse counterpart suggested the involvement of this gene in the specification of anterior-posterior axis, as well as in cell proliferation in early development. This protein was also found to interact with huntingtin interacting protein 2 (HIP2), an ubiquitin-conjugating enzyme, and possess ubiquitin ligase activity.

Interactions
RNF2 has been shown to interact with TFCP2 and HIP2.

See also
 RING finger domain

References

Further reading

External links 
 

RING finger proteins